The Manhan Rail Trail is a rails-to-trails paved recreational trail and non-motorized commuter route located in the lower Connecticut River Valley of Massachusetts in the town of Easthampton. The  trail, completed in 2003, is part of a larger rails-to-trails project that would extend from New Haven, Connecticut, to Northampton, Massachusetts. The trail, named after the Manhan River which it parallels, utilizes the bed of the former Pioneer Valley Railroad, which served the industrial towns of the lower Pioneer Valley from the mid-19th century until 1992. It begins at the Northampton/Easthampton line near Route 10 and ends at Coleman Road, just over the Southampton town line. There are plans to extend the route south through Southampton and eventually to Westfield to connect with the Columbia Greenway.

The Manhan Rail Trail, universally accessible, is open to walking, running, bicycling, inline skating and, in the winter, cross country skiing. The trail also provides a non-motorized commuter transportation route linking Easthampton, Northampton, and Southampton, Massachusetts. The trail is part of the Commonwealth Connections greenway initiative which links it to the adjacent trails of the Mount Tom Range and the Arcadia Audubon Sanctuary.

The Manhan Rail Trail served the surrounding community for eight years as the location for Derrill's Race.

References

External links
 Friends of the Manhan Trail
 Northampton and Easthampton Area Trails and Bike Map

Protected areas of Hampshire County, Massachusetts
Rail trails in Massachusetts
2003 establishments in Massachusetts